Gansu cuisine also known as Long cuisine (陇菜) is the regional cooking style of the Han Chinese deeply influence by the local Hui people in the Gansu province of Northwestern China.

Characteristic features 
Gansu was the historical destination along the Silk Road that marked the entrance into China through the Hexi Corridor. All migration into China by the Northern Silk Road including economic and military passed through Gansu leading to the formation of Arabic, Islamic, and Chinese cultural characteristics within the region. 

Islam has historically dominated the region lending the strong practice of halal among local Hui and Han populations. Gansu cuisine is unique for the signature Hui influence that is found only in Northwest China. The halal preference has shaped the cuisine to revolve around roasting, steaming, and braising of primarily beef and mutton/lamb but seldom pork (in accordance to halal doctrine) and chicken despite the two animals being most common in other Chinese cuisines. 

The climate for Northwestern China is generally too arid and cold to grow rice making wheat, barley, millet, beans, and sweet potatoes as the main sources of starch. Gansu is famed throughout China for their regional variation to hand-pulled noodles locally referred to as "dragon whiskers" which are skillfully stretched until the noodles are near needle-like in thinness hence their name. Other famed starchy dishes are steamed buns, dumplings, and pancakes.

The regional terrain ranges from desert, mountain, and plains making local dishes hardy and fulfilling by usually being very fatty and oily.

Salty, sour, and spicy are the prevailing flavors in dishes.

Gansu cuisine is also influenced by the strongly Islamic provinces of Xinjiang and Ningxia as well as the Sichuan province.

Notable dishes

See also 

 Chinese cuisine
 Flavorful Origins -  television documentary series examining cuisines of Chaoshan, Yunnan, and Gansu
 Sichuan cuisine
 Xinjiang cuisine

References 

Regional cuisines of China
Culture in Gansu
Chinese cuisine